Abdelhak Benaniba (born 10 June 1995) is a French footballer who plays as a midfielder for Sainte-Geneviève.

References

1995 births
Living people
Association football midfielders
French footballers
Ligue 2 players
US Créteil-Lusitanos players
US Biskra players
US Ivry players
FC Versailles 78 players
Sainte-Geneviève Sports players